Ligeia was an American metalcore band from Massachusetts, formed in 2003.

History 
Originally formed in the winter of 2003 by Keith Holuk and Ryan Ober, Ligeia solidified their lineup with the additions of Brandon Whipple and Patrick Murphy in 2007. Their debut album, Your Ghost Is a Gift, was recorded in December 2004 by Ken Susi of Unearth and released in late March 2006 on Ferret Music. Ligeia released their second album, Bad News, in August 2008 on Ferret Records.

Ligeia has maintained a DIY work ethic since their inception and because of their "take no prisoners" attitude, have played over 600 shows in the last two years, including a highly successful run on the "Two Dollar Brawler" tour in 2007.

Ligeia has toured across the U.S. and Canada countless times, as well as pulling stints in the UK, Europe and South America. They have toured with such bands as The Acacia Strain, Misery Signals, Haste The Day, Remembering Never, August Burns Red, in addition to countless others.

Their debut album Your Ghost Is a Gift was produced by Ken Susi (Unearth) and released in late March 2006 on Ferret Music. Now, two years later Ligeia returns with the release of Bad News. With Ken Susi once again handling the producer duties, Ligeia is poised and ready to take the next step.

"Bad News is the story of our lives for the last couple of years," says frontman Keith Holuk. "Touring nonstop...problems we've faced and overcome, members coming and going. This album is how we feel, it's who we are. We're having fun and we hope the kids like it. And this time around, it's not just about the breakdowns."

Breakup 
On May 21, 2009, Ligeia failed to show up to a scheduled show in Connecticut at the El-N-Gee Club. On May 22, 2009, they also no-showed a scheduled show in Rochester, New York, at The Jukebox. Upon contacting Ligeia, they indicated that they had disbanded.

On May 23, 2009, three days into their US/Australia tour with Deez Nuts, an announcement was made on their Myspace page that they were breaking up. Singer, Keith Holuk disclosed on his Myspace page that the band is currently on "hiatus" although no official Press Release has been given.

They were the second major New England band to announce their breakup in the month of May, the first being Have Heart ten days earlier.

Reunion (2010–2011) 
Ligeia announced on June 15, 2010, via their Myspace page that the band's hiatus was over and they were working on a new album.

Ligeia's comeback show took place in Moosup, Connecticut on February 1, 2011, just days before they head back to Canada for their "Fear of Freezing" Headlining Tour with the Canadian bands A Sight For Sewn Eyes and Right Before the Rise. The tour spans from Ontario and Quebec from February 4–26, 2011, with the kickoff show being held in London, ON.

On July 31, 2011, Ligeia Entered The Bear's Den Recording Studio with Producer Jay DeLuca to begin recording new material.

Welcome to Palm City (2011) 
On November 3, 2011, the band released a studio update video which included the song "Simulated Drowning", the band's first release since 2008. The EP "Welcome To Palm City" will be completely free and available on their website for fans to download. The Album was produced and recorded by Jay DeLuca, and mastered by Kris Crummett.

Band members

Current lineup 
 Keith Holuk – vocals (2003–2009, 2010–2011)
 Ryan Ober – guitar (2003–2009, 2010–2011)
 Brandon Whipple – bass (2007–2009, 2010–2011)
 Michael Comeiro – drums (2008, 2011)

Previous members 
 Phil Fonseca – drums (2003–2006, 2008–2009)
 Matthew Bennett – bass (2003–2006)
 Chris Keane – guitar (2003–2006)
 Bryan Forbes – bass (2006-200?)
 Ryan Irizarry – drums (2006-200?)
 Jake Lawrence – drums (2007)
 Michael Comeiro – drums (2008)
 Nick Neumeister – drums (2008)
 Patrick Murphy – drums
 Jeanne Sagan – bass
 Eric "Rabbit" Gross – drums (2010–2011)

Discography

Music videos 
 "Beyond a Doubt" from Your Ghost Is a Gift
 "Household Stereotypes" from Your Ghost Is a Gift
 "I've Been Drinkin'" from Bad News

References

External links 
 Official MySpace Page

Metalcore musical groups from Massachusetts
Heavy metal musical groups from Massachusetts
Musical groups established in 2003
Ferret Music artists